Cerejeiras is a municipality located in the Brazilian state of Rondônia. Its population was 16,204 (2020) and its area is 2,783 km².

The municipality contains 28% of the  Corumbiara State Park, created in 1990.

References

Municipalities in Rondônia